Freyda F. Koplow was an American politician who was elected to the Massachusetts House of Representatives in 1955. She served in the House of Representatives until 1967. She was appointed by Governor John Volpe as the state's first female banking commissioner, a position which she held until 1975. She was paid $15,000 per year.

References 

Women state legislators in Massachusetts
Members of the Massachusetts House of Representatives